Players and pairs who neither have high enough rankings nor receive wild cards may participate in a qualifying tournament held one week before the annual Wimbledon Tennis Championships.

Seeds

  Jon Levine /  Brad Pearce (second round)
  Givaldo Barbosa /  Mauro Menezes (qualifying competition, lucky losers)
  Mark Basham /  Luke Jensen (qualified)
  Craig Campbell /  Dan Cassidy (first round)
  Alexandre Hocevar /  Marcos Hocevar (second round)
  Brian Levine /  Peter Palandjian (second round, withdrew)
  Neil Broad /  Stefan Kruger (qualified)
  John Letts /  Craig D. Miller (second round)
  Warren Green /  Piet Norval (second round)
  Shane Barr /  Roger Rasheed (second round)

Qualifiers

  Thierry Champion /  Éric Winogradsky
  Stephan Medem /  Olli Rahnasto
  Mark Basham  Luke Jensen
  Neil Broad /  Stefan Kruger
  Steve DeVries /  Richard Matuszewski

Lucky losers

  Givaldo Barbosa /  Mauro Menezes
  Heiner Moraing /  Peter Moraing
  Zeeshan Ali /  Mark Ferreira
  Austen Brice /  Jason Goodall

Qualifying draw

First qualifier

Second qualifier

Third qualifier

Fourth qualifier

Fifth qualifier

External links

1988 Wimbledon Championships – Men's draws and results at the International Tennis Federation

Men's Doubles Qualifying
Wimbledon Championship by year – Men's doubles qualifying